The 2019 FIBA Under-16 Asian Championship was originally to be the qualifying tournament for FIBA Asia at the 2020 FIBA Under-17 Basketball World Cup. The tournament would have been held in Beirut, Lebanon from 5 to 12 April 2020. The top four teams would have represented FIBA Asia at the Under-17 Basketball World Cup in Bulgaria. However it was cancelled by FIBA due to the coronavirus pandemic in China. Instead it was determined by FIBA rankings.

Qualification 

Aside from the host nation and the defending champions, each of FIBA Asia's six subzones also gets one berth each, except for the Persian Gulf, East Asia and West Asian subzones, which were allocated two berths each. Rounding out the 16-team tournament are the four berths that would be added to each subzone, depending on its teams' performance in the previous championship.

Qualified teams 
Here are the list of the qualified teams:

Included are the teams' FIBA World Rankings prior to the tournament (as of 7 December 2018).

References 

FIBA Asia Under-16 Championship
2019–20 in Asian basketball
International basketball competitions hosted by Lebanon
April 2020 sports events in Asia
2020
Basketball events cancelled due to the COVID-19 pandemic